Wilhelm Lippa (born 2 May 1923) was an Austrian diver. He competed in two events at the 1948 Summer Olympics.

References

External links
 

1923 births
Possibly living people
Austrian male divers
Olympic divers of Austria
Divers at the 1948 Summer Olympics
Place of birth missing (living people)